This article is a list of Belgian television related events from 1956.

Events
24 May - Belgium enters the Eurovision Song Contest for the first time with "Messieurs les noyés de la Seine", performed by Fud Leclerc and "Le plus beau jour de ma vie", performed by Mony Marc.

Debuts

Television shows

Ending this year

Births
19 March - Karel Deruwe, actor
26 March - Gene Bervoets, actor & TV host
27 August - Jessie De Caluwe, TV & radio host
19 November - Martine Jonckheere, actress

Deaths